Valentino Tontodonati (born 14 November 1959) is an Italian lightweight rower. He won a gold medal at the 1982 World Rowing Championships in Lucerne with the lightweight men's eight.

References

External links
 

Italian male rowers
World Rowing Championships medalists for Italy
Living people
1959 births